Bruna Cusí Echaniz (born 9 September 1986) is a Spanish actress, winner of Goya Award for Best New Actress in 2018.

Filmography

Film

Television

References

External links

1986 births
Living people
Spanish film actresses
Actresses from Barcelona
Spanish television actresses
21st-century Spanish actresses